
Year 754 (DCCLIV) was a common year starting on Tuesday (link will display the full calendar) of the Julian calendar. The denomination 754 for this year has been used since the early medieval period, when the Anno Domini calendar era became the prevalent method in Europe for naming years.

Events 
 By place 

 Europe 
 July – Stephen II anoints Pepin's sons, Charles (later known as Charlemagne) and Carloman, consecrating them as patricians. At Quierzy he proclaims the Carolingian Dynasty holy, and appeals for help against the Lombards. Finally, the Frankish nobles give their consent to a campaign in Lombardy.
 July 28 – Pope Stephen II re-consecrates Pepin III (the Short) as king of the Franks, at the Basilica of Saint-Denis outside Paris, bestowing upon him the additional title of Patricius of the Romans. This marks the first recorded crowning of a civil ruler by a pope. Pepin assumes the role of ordained protector of the Catholic Church.

 Summer – The Franks under Pepin III invade Italy, and defeat the Lombards under King Aistulf, in the Susa Valley (Piedmont). He enforces the terms, including cession of the Exarchate of Ravenna to Rome.
 The oldest document mentioning the city of Ferrara (Northern Italy) is from this year (approximate date).

 Abbasid Caliphate 
 June 10 – Caliph as-Saffah dies of smallpox after a 4-year reign. He is succeeded by his nominated heir and brother al-Mansur, as ruler of the Abbasid Caliphate. 

 November – Abdallah ibn Ali, governor of Syria and uncle of as-Saffah, launches a claim for the caliphate, but is defeated by forces loyal to al-Mansur, under Abu Muslim, at Nisibis (modern Turkey).

 Asia 
 Jianzhen, Chinese Buddhist monk, arrives in Nara, where he is welcomed by former emperor Shōmu and empress Kōmyō. During his visit Jianzhen introduces sugar to the Japanese court, using it to mask the flavors of foul-tasting herbal tea. 
 A Tang census shows that 75% of the Chinese live north of the Chang Jiang (Yangtze) River. The capital of Chang'an has a population of 2 million and more than 25 other cities have well over 500,000 citizens (approximate date).

 By topic 

 Religion 
 February – Council of Hieria: Emperor Constantine V summons a Christian council in the palace of Hieria in Constantinople. The council, under the presidency of Bishop Theodosius of Ephesus, supports the policy of Iconoclasm and condemning the use of religious images (icons) in the Byzantine Empire. Constantine increases the persecution of the monasteries; hundreds of monks and nuns are mutilated or put to death. 
 June 5 – Boniface, Anglo-Saxon missionary, is killed by a band of pagans at Dokkum in Frisia, while reading the Scriptures to Christian converts. He is later buried in the Abbey of Fulda, entrusted to his Bavarian disciple Sturm.

Births 
 Hildegard of the Vinzgau, Frankish queen and wife of Charlemange (d. 783)
 Li Fan, chancellor of the Tang Dynasty (d. 811)

Deaths 

 June 5 
 Boniface, Anglo-Saxon missionary
 Eoban, bishop of Utrecht
 June 10 – Abul Abbas al-Saffah, Muslim caliph 
 August 17 – Carloman mayor of the palace of Austrasia and brother of Pepin III (The Short)
 Ansemund, Visigothic count
 Burchard, bishop of Würzburg (approximate date) 
 Childeric III, king of the Franks (approximate date)
 Cui Hao, Chinese poet
 Hiltrud, duchess regent of Bavaria (b. 716)
 Li Linfu, chancellor of the Tang Dynasty
 Rhodri Molwynog, king of Gwynedd (Wales)

References